Mathinna (1835–1852) was an Aboriginal Tasmanian girl, who was adopted and later abandoned by the Governor of Tasmania, Sir John Franklin.

Mathinna was born as Mary on Flinders Island, Tasmania to the chief of the Lowreenne tribe, Towgerer, and his wife Wongerneep, but the tribe was captured by George Augustus Robinson, the Chief Protector of Aborigines, in 1833. Mary was renamed Mathinna when she was about six years old 

In 1837 Sir John Franklin was appointed Lieutenant Governor of Van Diemen's Land for a term of four years It was during this time that Sir John Franklin and his wife, Lady Jane Franklin requested an Aboriginal boy or girl. Mathinna was sent to Hobart to live with the Franklin's although she was not an orphan. Mathinna was raised with Sir John's daughter Eleanor.

Just one fragment of a letter written by Mathinna reveals what the transition from living with her family at Flinders Island to living at Government House in Hobart Town must have been like:

When Franklin was recalled to England, they left Mathinna at Queen’s Orphan School in Hobart in 1843. Only eight years old, she found it difficult to adjust to her new surroundings. She was sent back to Flinders Island in 1844, at the age of nine, and then sent back to Queen's Orphan School. In 1851, when she was about 16, she returned to the Aboriginal settlement at Oyster Cove, west of Hobart.

She drowned—according to one account—in a puddle while drunk on 1 September 1852. She was 17 or 18 years old.

Mathinna is believed to have been buried in the Oyster Cove Aboriginal cemetery and is likely to have been among the remains exhumed in 1907 and taken to the University of Melbourne. After a campaign by the Tasmanian Aboriginal Centre, all remains from Oyster Cove were returned and cremated in a four-day ceremony in 1985.

The town of Mathinna is named after her, as is the mushroom Entoloma mathinnae.

See also
List of kidnappings

Cultural depictions of Mathinna
Mathinna's life has inspired or been mentioned in several literary and dramatic works. These include:

1954: Mathinna, a ballet production by Laurel Martyn, one of the first Australian-made works on Australian themes
1967: Children's historical fiction book titled Mathinna's People by Nan Chauncy
2000: Radio play (BBC, ABC) In Her Father's House, by Carmel Bird 
 2005: Lady Franklin's Revenge, by Ken McGoogan, a non-fiction work about the wife of John Franklin
2008: Contemporary piece titled Mathinna choreographed by Stephen Page for the Bangarra Dance Theatre, inspired by the Laurel Martyn work
2008: Novel titled Wanting by Richard Flanagan
2020: Novel titled The Exiles by Christina Baker Kline

References

External links
Mathinna arts.abc.net.au
The National Picture: The Art of Tasmania’s Black War

1835 births
1852 deaths
Australian adoptees
Indigenous Tasmanian people
Kidnapped Australian children